Robert Herring House is a historic home located at Clinton, Sampson County, North Carolina.   It was built in 1916, and is a two-story, five-bay by five-bay, Classical Revival style frame dwelling with a slate hipped roof.  The front features a two-story central portico, with paired and fluted Corinthian order columns and a one-story wraparound porch with Ionic order capitals.  The house is similar to one built by Robert Herring's first cousin Troy Herring of Roseboro in 1912.

It was added to the National Register of Historic Places in 1986.

References

Houses on the National Register of Historic Places in North Carolina
Neoclassical architecture in North Carolina
Houses completed in 1916
Houses in Sampson County, North Carolina
National Register of Historic Places in Sampson County, North Carolina